is a Japanese four-panel manga series written and illustrated by Yui Hara and published by Houbunsha. An anime television series adaptation by Nexus aired in Japan between July and September 2015.

Plot
Wakaba Kohashi is a "a slightly out-of-tune super" daughter of a well-to-do family. She looks like an elegant rich daughter, but admires the trendy "gyaru" fashion subculture. Her friends are the pure, innocent, fairy-tale-like Moeko, the capricious Mao, and Nao who used to be an athletic type of girl, but now loves the boys-love genre. Most of the series takes place at Shirozume Girls High School.

Characters

Media

Manga

Anime 
An anime television series adaptation by Nexus aired in Japan between July 3, 2015 and September 25, 2015, and was simulcast by Crunchyroll. Character designs were created by Kana Ishida and the scripts were written by Jukki Hanada.

Episode list

References

External links 
  
 

2010 manga
2015 anime television series debuts
Anime series based on manga
Comedy anime and manga
Houbunsha manga
Nexus (animation studio)
Seinen manga
Sentai Filmworks
Tokyo MX original programming
Yonkoma